Areia was a cultic epithet of the Greek goddess Athena, under which she was worshipped at Athens.

Athena's statue, together with those of Ares, Aphrodite Areia, and Enyo, stood in the temple of Ares at Athens. There was also a colossal acrolithic statue of her, at a temple at Plataea, built with the spoils given to that city by the Athenians after the Battle of Marathon. This was supposedly created by the artist Pheidias, though there is some disagreement among modern scholars whether this was indeed created by that artist. Plutarch mentions a gilded statue in this temple, but does not specify the name of the deity it honors.

Athena's worship under this name was said to have been instituted by Orestes after he had been acquitted by the Areopagus of the murder of his mother. It was Athena Areia who gave her casting vote in cases where the Areopagites were equally divided. There is some epigraphic evidence of a distinct priesthood for this aspect of Athena, but all we have are incomplete fragments, primarily of an oath from this priesthood at Acharnae.

From these circumstances, it has been surmised by some scholars (primarily in the 19th century) that the name "Areia" ought not to be derived from Ares, but from "ara" (ἀρά), a prayer, or from "areo" (ἀρέω) or "aresko" (ἀρέσκω), to propitiate or atone for. This is not considered likely by modern scholars.

Notes

Epithets of Athena